Nematopoa is a genus of African plants in the grass family. The only known species is Nematopoa longipes, native to Zambia and Zimbabwe.

References

Molinieae
Grasses of Africa
Monotypic Poaceae genera